Phthiriinae is a subfamily of bee flies in the family Bombyliidae. There are about 11 genera and more than 120 described species in Phthiriinae.

Genera
These 11 genera belong to the subfamily Phthiriinae:
 Acreophthiria Evenhuis, 1986 i c g b
 Acreotrichus Macquart, 1850 c g
 Australiphthiria Evenhuis, 1986 c g
 Euryphthiria Evenhuis, 1986 i c g
 Neacreotrichus Cockerell, 1917 i c g b
 Phthiria Meigen, 1803 i c g
 Poecilognathus Jaennicke, 1867 i c g b
 Pygocona Hull, 1973 c g
 Relictiphthiria Evenhuis, 1986 i c g
 Tmemophlebia Evenhuis, 1986 i c g b
 † Elektrophthiria Nel, 2006 g
Data sources: i = ITIS, c = Catalogue of Life, g = GBIF, b = Bugguide.net

References

Further reading

External links

 

Bombyliidae